Mykhailo Stelmakh (born 29 April 1966) is a Ukrainian football manager and former player.

Club career
Born in Zolochiv, Ukrainian SSR, Soviet Union, he played with FC Dynamo Kyiv and FC Shakhtar Donetsk in the Soviet First League. In 1992, he had a spell with FK Spartak Subotica in the First League of FR Yugoslavia before returning to, now independent, Ukraine and play with FC Karpaty Lviv, FC Vorskla Poltava and FC CSKA Kyiv.

After retiring he became a coach, first as assistant manager of FC CSKA Kyiv and FC Kharkiv and then main coach of FC Kharkiv between 2008 and 2010.

Honours
Boryspil
Ukrainian Second League: 1993–94

Vorskla Poltava
Ukrainian First League: 1995–96

CSKA-Borysfen Kyiv
Ukrainian Second League: 1995–96

References

External sources
 Mykhailo Stelmakh at playerhisytory.com

1966 births
Living people
People from Zolochiv, Lviv Oblast
Soviet footballers
Ukrainian footballers
Association football midfielders
FC Dynamo Kyiv players
FC Halychyna Drohobych players
FC Shakhtar Donetsk players
FC Karpaty Lviv players
MFC Mykolaiv players
FC Arsenal Kyiv players
FC Vorskla Poltava players
FK Spartak Subotica players
Expatriate footballers in Serbia and Montenegro
Ukrainian football managers
FC Kharkiv managers
Ukrainian Premier League managers
Soviet Top League players
Ukrainian Premier League players
Sportspeople from Lviv Oblast